, is a Japanese idol, actor, and singer. He is currently a member of Johnny & Associates unit SixTONES.

Background 
‘Yugo’ was a name given by his grandfather, with the hope of him growing up to be a kind person. He was in football club during the Primary and Junior High School, while even becoming a candidate for his regional team of Yokohama during Junior High School. Though he could not continue with football in high school, he created a Futsal team with his university friends and even reached the top 16 of Kanto Tournament.  

Kochi is known to love visiting different hot springs during his free time, and it was revealed that he got his ‘Hot Spring Sommelier’ qualification in 2019.

Career 

Kochi, who had no plans of entering the entertainment world joined Johnny & Associates after winning the audition program held in "School Kakumei!", whose application was sent in by his friend. He won the regular spot on the program beating more than 1300 contestants.

On June 4, 2009, Kochi became a member of Yuma Nakayama w/B.I.Shadow along with Nakayama Yuma, Nakajima Kento, Kikuchi Fuma and Matsumura Hokuto. Three days later on June 7, Hey!Say!JUMP's Yamada Ryousuke and Chinen Yuri were added to the group to form a limited-time unit "NYC Boys" with whom Kochi made CD-debut on June 15, 2009.

On March 29, 2011, B.IShadow's members Kikuchi Fuma and Nakajima Kento announced their debut as a member of Sexy Zone on the November of the same year, leading to the de facto dissolution of B.I.Shadow.

Kouchi made his debut as an actor on April 14, 2012, in "Shiritsu Bakaleya Koukou" in the role of Makoto.

Beginning from July 2019, he has a regular spot "Egao no YouGo!" in the "Yokohama Walker" magazine. On August 8, 2019, during the "Johnnys Junior 8.8 Matsuri~ Tokyo Dome kara hajiramu", it was announced that he will be making CD debut with his group SixTONES in 2020.

Filmography

Television

Film

References 

1994 births
21st-century Japanese male actors
Male actors from Yokohama
Living people